The Vyatka or Viatka (vyatskaya loshad) is an endangered breed of horse native to the former Vyatka region, now the Kirov Oblast of the Russian Federation. It is mainly found there and in the Udmurt Republic. It is named for the Vyatka River.

History 

The Vyatka was influenced by the climate and terrain of the Kirov, Udmurtia and western Perm regions; Estonian horses and Kleppers brought to northern Russia in the fourteenth century by Novgorod colonists may have affected its conformation, as may later imports of Estonian horses for mining work in the Ural Mountains. The Vyatka was valued for its endurance, speed and frugality. By the middle of the nineteenth century it was considered the best horse for pulling troikas; some were exported from the Vyatka region, including to Poland.

In 1917 the breed was virtually extinct; some efforts at re-establishment were made after the Russian Revolution. Numbers in the Kirov and Udmurtia were estimated at 2000 in 1980. In 2003 the known population numbered 560, and in 2007 the Vyatka was on the Endangered List of the FAO.

Characteristics 

The usual coat color was originally a striped dun with primitive markings – zebra stripes and a dorsal stripe; it has become more variable, and may also be roan, bay, brown or chestnut, or occasionally black.

References 

Horse breeds originating in Russia